The WCPW Heavyweight Championship is a professional wrestling heavyweight championship in Windy City Pro Wrestling (WCPW). It was the original top singles championship for the promotion before the creation of the WCPW League Championship in 1993 and its incorporation into the then newly created weight-class division as a legitimate heavyweight title (over 240 lbs). It was eventually unified with the Bare Knuckles and League Championships to create the "WCPW World Heavyweight Championship".

The inaugural champion was "Mr. Electric" Steve Regal, who won the title in Chicago, Illinois on April 13, 1988 to become the first WCPW Heavyweight Champion. Sean Mulligan holds the record for most reigns, with four. At 1,092 days, Ripper Manson's first and only reign is the longest in the title's history. He is the only wrestler in the promotion's history to retire as champion. Mulligan's second reign was the shortest in the history of the title as it was returned to him on the same night as he lost it. Overall, there have been 25 reigns shared between 17 wrestlers, with four vacancies, and 1 deactivation.

Title history
Key

Names

Reigns

Combined reigns

References

External links
WindyCityProWrestling.com
Title History - Windy City Pro Wrestling

Heavyweight Championship
Heavyweight wrestling championships